The Savage family is an English noble family founded by Thomas Le Sauvage (Savage), who came to England as part of William the Conqueror's Norman army in 1066 and settled in Derbyshire after the conquest, taking residence in Scarcliffe. Thomas Le Sauvage's name appears in a list of Normans who survived the Battle of Hastings. In the 14th century a branch of the family was established in Cheshire, and this was the place where they became most prominent, with several members ascending to the peerage and positions of power such as Archbishop of York. The Cheshire branch of the family built the primary family seat Rocksavage, the house was one of the great Elizabethan houses of the county and a leading example of the Elizabethan prodigy house. There were further branches of the family in Dorset, Gloucestershire and Kent, as well as one in Ireland, which was created following the arrival of Sir William Savage, Baron Savage in Ulster as a companion of Sir John de Courcy. Many of the family are buried in tombs in the family chapel at St Michael's Church, Macclesfield.

History

The family was founded by Thomas Le Sauvage (Savage), who came to England as part of William the Conqueror's Norman army in 1066 and following the conquest gained land in Derbyshire where he settled, taking residence in Scarcliffe. The Savages became established members of the landed gentry and in the 14th century a branch of the family was established in Cheshire when Sir John Savage (1343–1386) married Margaret d'Anyers, heiress of Clifton and other lands around what became called Rocksavage, this was the place where the family became most prominent. One of the first members of the Cheshire branch of the family to gain prominence was Sir John Savage (died 1450), who served Henry V of England in his wars in France and was knighted by the King after the Battle of Agincourt, gaining influence in the County Palatine especially in Macclesfield where the Savage chapel would be built in St Michael's Church. This branch of the family would also build the primary family seat of Rocksavage, only a short distance from their previous seat of Clifton Hall.

The Savages married into several notable noble families such as the Stanleys and the Morleys. Before eventually ascending to the peerage themselves, first as Viscounts Savage and later as Earls Rivers.

The men of the Savage family have often received the first name John, which has caused some degree of confusion when investigating the Savage lineage. For nearly two centuries the family heir was always named John, and at times there could be as many as four John Savages. One Sir John Savage was knighted by Henry V for his service at the Battle of Agincourt whilst another Sir John Savage was one of the main commanders of Henry VII's army at the Battle of Bosworth Field leading the left flank to victory that day and is said to have personally slain the Duke of Norfolk in single combat, already a Knight of the Bath he was later made a Knight of the Garter (the most senior order of knighthood in England) following Henry's ascension to the throne. The family titles became extinct on the death of the 5th Earl Rivers in 1737, who having been a Catholic priest was unmarried and had no issue. He had inherited the title from his cousin Richard Savage, 4th Earl Rivers a General in the British Army who had no legitimate male heir. The families primary seat of Rocksavage remained in the family until late in the 18th century when the last heiress in the direct line married into the Cholmondeley family and the estate passed to them. The house was deemed surplus to requirements with the family already possessing Cholmondeley House (now Cholmondeley Castle), and the estate quickly fell into disrepair and ruin. Today only sections of the house's garden and orchard walls remain.

Prominent family members
Sir Arnold Savage (died 1375) - Knight who held several positions of note. Commissioner of array in Kent (1346), lieutenant of the Seneschal of Gascony (1350), Warden of the Coasts of Kent (1355) and Mayor of Bordeaux (1359–63)
Sir Arnold Savage (8 September 1358 – 1410) - Knight who served as Speaker of the House of Commons and was involved in the suppression of the Peasants' Revolt in 1381. Son of the former Sir Arnold.
Sir John Savage (c.1370–1450) - Knight who fought at the Battle of Agincourt and received his knighthood from Henry V for his service there.
Sir John Savage (1444–1492) KG and KB. Knight and military commander (Knight banneret) who commanded the left flank of Henry VII's army to victory at the Battle of Bosworth Field where he is said to have personally slain the Duke of Norfolk in single combat, and ultimately helped to put Henry on the throne of England. Sir John also took part in the Battle of Barnet, the Battle of Tewkesbury (both 1471), the invasion of Scotland in 1482 and the Battle of Stoke Field in 1487. Following his victory at Bosworth Henry VII sent Sir John to arrest Sir Humphrey Stafford and his brother Thomas Stafford, who were key actors in the Stafford and Lovell rebellion, the first armed uprising against Henry's young reign. Sir John led 60 armed men to the abbey where the Staffords were hiding and had them forcibly removed. This event prompted a series of protests to Pope Innocent VIII over the breaking of the right of sanctuary which in turn resulted in a papal bull in August of the same year which agreed to some modifications affecting the privilege. He was killed at the Siege of Boulogne when he was intercepted whilst on reconnaissance and refused to surrender. Grandson of Lord Stanley and nephew of Thomas Stanley, 1st Earl of Derby. Left a legitimate son, also called Sir John Savage, who was the ancestor of the Earls Rivers, as well as an illegitimate son George Savage, who was the father of Edmund Bonner Bishop of London who was instrumental in the schism of Henry VIII from Rome before reconciling himself to Catholicism. He became notorious as "Bloody Bonner" for his role in the persecution of heretics under the Catholic government of Mary I of England, and ended his life as a prisoner under Queen Elizabeth.
Archbishop of York Thomas Savage (1449 – 3 September 1507 - Bishop and diplomat, younger brother of Sir John Savage. Chaplain to King Henry VII. Served as Bishop of Rochester and Bishop of London before becoming Archbishop of York in 1501. Also Served as English ambassador to Castile and Portugal in 1488, during which time he helped broker the marriage treaty between Arthur, Prince of Wales and Catherine of Aragon in 1489 and then to France in 1490, where he participated in the conference at Boulogne. While Archbishop he played a part in the marriage ceremony of Arthur, Prince of Wales, to Catherine of Aragon. Prince Arthur died young, and his brother Henry, who became Henry VIII, then married Princess Catherine. Archbishop Savage had earlier led the ceremony by which Henry was made Duke of York. Built the Savage Chapel at St Michael's Church, Macclesfield which served as the Savage family chapel.
John Savage (died 1586) - One of the key Catholic conspirators of the Babington plot to kill Elizabeth I of England and put the Catholic Mary, Queen of Scots on the throne. Savage was intended to be the member of the group who would personally assassinate Queen Elizabeth. He was violently executed along with his co-conspirators.
Thomas Savage, 1st Viscount Savage (c. 1586 – 20 November 1635) - Courtier of Charles I, served as First Commissioner of Trade and Commissioner to advise as to ways and means of increasing the King's revenue, and for the sale of the King's lands. Father of John Savage, 2nd Earl Rivers and husband of Elizabeth Savage, Countess Rivers.
Elizabeth Savage, Countess Rivers and Viscountess Savage - English courtier and a Royalist victim of uprisings during the English Civil War. Daughter of Thomas Darcy, 1st Earl Rivers, wife of Thomas Savage, 1st Viscount Savage and mother of John Savage, 2nd Earl Rivers
John Savage, 2nd Earl Rivers (25 February 1603 – 10 October 1654) - Member of Parliament for Cheshire and supporter of the Royalist cause. Raised the Earl Rivers Regiment of Foote in support of Charles I. Rocksavage ruined for the first time as a result of his Royalist affiliation.
Thomas Savage, 3rd Earl Rivers (c. 1628 – 14 September 1694) - Major General in the English army. Denounced as a Roman Catholic during the Popish Plot, although the Savage family had historically been Catholics the evidence was so flimsy that no charges were ever brought against him. Grandson of William Parker, 13th Baron Morley, 4th Baron Monteagle
Richard Savage, 4th Earl Rivers (ca. 1654 – 18 August 1712) - General in the English and then British armies. Held the positions of Master-General of the Ordnance, Constable of the Tower of London and was briefly commander-in-chief of the forces in lieu of James Butler, 2nd Duke of Ormonde until his death. The Earl was the first nobleman and one of the first persons who joined the Prince of Orange on his landing in England, and he accompanied the soon to be King William to London. One of the first members to be sworn in as a member of the Privy Council of the United Kingdom following the Acts of Union under Queen Anne. Rumoured to have been the father of the poet Richard Savage.  Father-in-law of Frederick Nassau de Zuylestein, 3rd Earl of Rochford and grandfather of William Nassau de Zuylestein, 4th Earl of Rochford and Richard Savage Nassau.
Sir John Boscawen Savage (1760 – 1843) - Major General in the Royal Marines who served as Deputy Adjutant-General Royal Marines (the professional head of the Royal Marines).
Walter Savage Landor (30 January 1775 – 17 September 1864) - English writer, poet, and activist.
Alfred, Lord Tennyson (6 August 1809 – 6 October 1892) - British poet who served as Poet Laureate during much of Queen Victoria's reign and remains one of the most popular British poets. Descended from John Savage, 2nd Earl Rivers.

Arms of the Savage Family

References

Noble families of the United Kingdom
History of Catholicism in England
Roman Catholic families
Political families of the United Kingdom
Catholicism in the United Kingdom
Savage family